John F. Murphy was an American lawyer and a professor at Villanova University.  He was a widely cited author.
He published multiple works on the intersection of international law and counter-terrorism.

Education

Legal career

Murphy spent the year following his earning of his law degree participating in Syracuse University's Afro-Asia Public Service Fellowship Program working in India with the Indian government. Upon his return he spent a year working on Wall Street. Next, was worked at the United States State Department's Office of the Legal Advisor from 1964 to 1967. He returned to private practice in 1967 to 1969.

In 1969 he took a teaching position at the University of Kansas School of Law. Since then he taught at Cornell University, Georgetown University, the Naval War College and finally Villanova, in the United States. Outside the USA he taught
in Aix-en-Provence, London, Mexico City, Paris and Haifa.

Murphy held positions of trust within professional organizations. For the American Bar Association he served as an Alternate Observer at the United States Mission to the United Nations and a member of its Council on International Law and participated in the Francis Shattack Security & Peace Initiative.

He served on the Executive Council of the American Society of International Law and on the Society's Board of Review and Development.

He was an honorary Vice President of the American Branch of the International Law Association. He served as a consultant to a number of organizations, including the State Department, the United States Department of Justice, the United Nations Crime Prevention Unit and the International Task Force on Prevention of Nuclear Terrorism. He served on the editorial boards of a number of legal journals.

In 2010 Murphy's employer, Villanova University, held a symposium to honor his forty-year tenure as a legal scholar.

John F. Murphy died on February 4, 2021, after a brief battle with infection. He was 83 years old.

Publications

References

Living people
1937 births
Charles H. Stockton Professors of International Law